Vasil Todorov Gyuzelev (born 19 October 1936) is a Bulgarian historian who studies Bulgaria during the Middle Ages.

Biography 
Gyuzelev was born in the village of Rakovski (today part of Dimitrovgrad) in 1936. Between 1954 and 1959 he studied history and archaeology in the Sofia University and then worked for a short time in the Museum of History in Dimitrovgrad. Gyuzelev worked in the Sofia university and served as a director of the National Museum of History between 1975 and 1977. In 1995 he became associate member and in 2003 academician of the Bulgarian Academy of Sciences.

Publications 
Gyuzelev is author of more than 50 books and 240 articles.

 1969, Prince Boris I: Bulgaria in the second half of the 9th century
 1987, Professor Petar Mutafchiev's Reflections on Bulgarian Medieval History
 1995, Essays on the History of the Bulgarian Northeast and the Black Sea: the end of the 12th century to the beginning of the 15th century
 2000, Reflections - on the New Exhibition of the National History Museum
 2001, Dos and Don'ts in My Life as a Museum Worker
 2005, An Attempt at a New Eulogy for Brothers Constantine-Cyril and Methodius
 2006, Bulgarians are a Nation with an Unlived Childhood
 —, We are Nostalgic for Another Nessebar

References

Sources

Further reading 
 Тангра. Сборник в чест на 70-годишнината на акад. Васил Гюзелев. София, 2006. 
 Библиография на научните трудове на преподавателите на Историческия факултет на Софийския университет "Св. Климент Охридски" (1995-2005). Съст. Й. Спасова и П. Тепавичарова. София, 2006, с. 48-54. 
 Тепавичарова, П., Николов, Г. Биобиблиография на Васил Гюзелев. София, 1996.

External links 
 акад. Васил Гюзелев 

1936 births
Living people
People from Dimitrovgrad, Bulgaria
20th-century Bulgarian historians
Bulgarian medievalists
Members of the Bulgarian Academy of Sciences
Herder Prize recipients
21st-century Bulgarian historians
Historians of Bulgaria